Microsegregation is a non-uniform chemical separation and concentration of elements or impurities in alloys after they have solidified.

References

Alloys
Chemistry